Taekwang Group is a large South Korean chaebol (conglomerate), producing clothing, apparel, chemical, industry, and financial services products.

Subsidiaries
Taekwang Industry
Taekwang Synthetic Fiber (ChangShu, China)
Taekwang Swimwear fabric factory (ChangShu, China)
Daehan Synthetic Fiber
Heungkuk Fire & Marine Insurance
Heungkuk Life Insurance
Incheon Heungkuk Life Pink Spiders
Goryo Mutual Savings Bank
Yegaram Mutual Savings Bank
Heungkuk Investment & Financial Services
Heungkuk Securities (original see Fides)
Taekwang Tour Development
T-broad
T-cast
KDMC*
tsis
Korea Book Promotions
Iljoo Academy
Iljoo Academy & Culture Foundation
Sehwa Academy & Culture Foundation

See also
Economy of South Korea
List of South Korean companies

References

External links
Taekwang Group Homepage

 
Chaebol